Botad is a city and district headquarters of Botad district, Gujarat, India. It is about 92 km from Bhavnagar and 133 km From Ahmedabad by road distance.

Botad district is made from Ahmedabad and Bhavnagar. Erstwhile, it was part of Bhavnagar district. Botad District is surrounded by Surendranagar District to the northeast, Rajkot districts to the west, Bhavnagar and Amreli to the south and Ahmedabad District to the East.

Geography
Botad is situated at the confluence of the streams which unite to form a small river Utavali. Botad is surrounded by low hills on the east and west, forming a valley. Utavali Creek flows through the town, and Madhu Creek joins the Utavali river near Ten Drains.

The town is a gateway to Kathiawad (toward Gadhada, Lathi and Amreli), and a crossroads of Gohilwad (towards Bhavnagar), Zalawad (Limbdi, Surendranagar) and Panchal (towards Paliyad, Vinchiya, Jasadan).

The Sukhbhadar River flows at the northern border of Botad district in Ranpur taluka. The Kalubhar River flows in southern part of Botad district in Gadhada taluka. The district is situated between 71E latitude and 22 N latitude &42 E longitudes to 10N longitudes. Kalubhar, Sukhbhadar, Ghelo, Utavali, and Goma are main rivers in the district. The district has a population of 6.52 lac as per last census-2011 andt is divided into two revenue sub-divisions and four talukas. There are 3 municipalities in the district.

Demographics
According to the 2011 Indian census the population of the town of Botad was 130,302 (67,778 men and 62,524 women). Total literacy was 94,563 (53,275 men and 41,288 women). The literacy rate is 83.21 per cent, of which male and female literacy was 88.89 per cent and 74.60 per cent respectively. Botad's overall sex ratio is 922 women per 1,000 men, with a child sex ratio of 874 girls to 1,000 boys. There were a total of 16,654 children (birth to age six), 8,889 boys and 7,765 girls (12.78 percent of the municipality's total population).

It had a population of 7450 souls according to the census of 1872, which increased to 7755 in 1881.

Climate
May and June have less rainfall and wind than the post-monsoon period. Thunderstorms are frequent in June and July, and fog is common in winter.

Economy
Although Botad's economy was based on agriculture, industries such as diamond cutting and processing, real estate, cotton processing and packing and healthcare are newer sectors.

The chief trade is in cotton, molasses, Radhanpuri ghee or clarified butter and products from Ahmedabad and Jamnagar which include silk, either plain or embroidered, and mostly used for female apparel.

Culture

The diet in Botad is predominantly vegetarian. Hunting is unpopular, and the city has a variety of fauna. Clothing varies with the seasons and their festivals. Women generally wear the Gujarati type of sari, and men wear kurtas and trousers.

Places of interest
Clock Tower in Botad was considered as a prominent attraction once developments started taking place during the reign of Maharaja Krushna Kumar Singhaji and Takht Singhji (Bhavnagar State). The clock tower was built by Shri Damodardar Jagjivan (Shah).  Today, Tower Chalk is the central business district on the city. There is a library in the building on his name.
 Gate of town (Gam Darawaja) used to be at what is known as Din Dayal Chalk right now.
 Tajiyo is a prominent building structure attraction of Botad, which attracts a large number of tourists every year. This structure was built with the aim of constructing a Clock Tower by a civil engineer and entrepreneur named Tulsi Mistri. He was denied permission to install a clock by the prince of the Bhavnagar state.
 Botad Lake was built by Maharaja Krishna Kumar Singhji (Bhavnagar State). The lake serves as a reservoir which supplies water to a majority of the areas belonging to the city even today. The lake is one of the attractive places to visit in Botad city.
 Shree Swaminarayna mandir located Inside Nagalpar gate in the city centre is big and popular. Swaminarayan temple built by BAPS gadi in Sahjanand Society is located little easterly Nagalpar gate. There is another popular Swaminarayan Temple with an associated Gurukul in Mangal Para, located south-westerly in the outskirts.  Also there are few other smaller Swaminarayan temples in the city. Virateshvar Mahadev Temple is located easterly in the outskirts.
 There is the shrine and tomb of the Muslim saint Pir Hamir Khan. He is said to have been the thanadar of Ranpur who died in the battle with the Khuman and Vala Kathis at Ugamedi, near Gadhada.
 There is a fine tank called the Phatsar, near the Satpura Hills, not far from this town. The lake which supplies water to most of the town was built by Krishna Kumar Singhji, maharaja of Bhavnagar State, and is a popular attraction.
 Haran Kui, or Spring or Well for Deer's, was a fresh water spring existing on the northern side of the city where thousands of Deer's as well as other wild animals used to cohabitate.

Points of Interest in District 

 Salangpur Hanumanji Temple [Shri Kashtabhanjan Hanumanji Temple and BAPS Swaminarayan Temple]- Gadhada is among the more prominent centres in the Swaminarayan Sampraday.
 Shree Swaminarayan Temple, Gadhada - old temple initiated by Lord Swaminarayan himself; and the massive new one built by BAPS gadi
 Bhimnath Mahadev - at Bhimnath, Polarpur is an ancient temple, associated with mythology of Mahabharata times [across border with Ahmedabad district]. The temple is small and housed in the middle of a River path, which gets flooded during monsoon.
 Pir Hamir Khan Shrine and Tomb in Ugamedi near Gadhada
 Kariyani Swaminarayan Mandir near Lathidad

Sports
Cricket is popular in Botad, and during the 1970s and 1980s the town hosted cricket tournaments with teams from Jasdan, Lathi and Bhavanagar. There are no sports facilities in Botad. Popular children's games include moy-dandiya, marbles and kabaddi.

Education
The public-school system in the city is operated by state government. The language of study is Gujarati in all public schools and most private schools. A few elementary schools provide instruction in English.

Botad High School was the first high school built after Independence of India. The city has a number of colleges. Kavi Shri Damodardas Botadkar College was founded during the mid-1960s. The Mahila (Women's) College began in 1995. Both schools offer courses in languages, economics, accounting, business administration and commerce. The Shree Santram Education Trust includes Shree K. Rajyaguruji Prathmik Shala (primary school) and Madhyamik Shala (secondary school). The Shree Samanvay Trust offers MBA and B.Pharm degrees. The Takshashila Educational and Charitable Trust offers B.Ed degrees. Shri JM Sabva Institute of Engineering and Technology (JMSIET) provides technical education. It was founded in 2011 and managed Shri Aradhana Educational & Charitable Trust.

Transport
Botad is well connected to Ahmedabad, Mumbai, Surat, Vadodara, Bhavangar, Rajkot and Surendranagar by rail and road. With Botad Junction railway station, there is direct rail service to Mumbai, Ahmedabad, Surat, Pune, Hyderabad, Kakinada, Asansol, Delhi Sarai Rohilla and Kochuveli on the east coast.

Notable people 

 Jhaverchand Meghani, Gujarati writer and freedom fighter whom Mahatma Gandhi gave the title of. Raashtreeya Shaayar (National Poet))
 Mohammad Mankad, poet, writer, social reformer and freedom fighter
 Damodar Botadkar Famous Poet of 20th century

Notes and references
3 Dr.rajesh chauhan research work. 
https://www.botad.xyz/
 This article incorporates text from a publication now in the public domain: 

Cities and towns in Botad district